The yellow snake eel (Ophichthus zophochir, also known as the charmed snake eel) is an eel in the family Ophichthidae. It was described by David Starr Jordan and Charles Henry Gilbert in 1882. It is a marine, subtropical eel known from the eastern central and southeastern Pacific Ocean, including Chile, Costa Rica, Colombia, Ecuador, Guatemala, El Salvador, Honduras, Nicaragua, Mexico, Panama, Peru, and the United States.

The species epithet zophochir, derived from the Greek term for "dark hand", refers to the dark colouring of the eel's pectoral fin. Its diet consists of bony fish and clams. Due to its wide distribution in the eastern Pacific, lack of known threats, and lack of observed population decline, the IUCN redlist currently lists the yellow snake-eel as Least Concern.

References

Taxa named by David Starr Jordan
Taxa named by Charles Henry Gilbert
Fish described in 1882
Ophichthus